William Brodie Gurney (1777–1855) was an English shorthand writer and philanthropist of the 19th century.

Biography
Gurney was the younger son of Joseph Gurney, shorthand writer, who died at Walworth, Surrey, in 1815, by a daughter of William Brodie of Mansfield. He was the grandson of Thomas Gurney (1705–1770), the shorthand writer, and brother of Sir John Gurney (1768–1845),

Born at Stamford Hill, London, on 24 December 1777, he was taught by Mr. Burnside at Walworth in 1787, and afterwards by a Mr. Freeman. He received adult baptism at Maze Pond Chapel, Southwark on 1 August 1796. Adopting the profession of his father and his grandfather, he commenced practice as a shorthand writer in 1803, and between that date and 1844 he took down in shorthand many of the most important appeals, trials, courts-martial, addresses, speeches, and libel cases, a number of which were printed as volumes from his notes. In pursuit of his calling he frequently visited Ireland and Scotland and many parts of England. He reported the impeachment of Lord Melville in 1806, the proceedings against the Duke of York in 1809, the trials of Lord Cochrane in 1814 and of Arthur Thistlewood in 1820, and the proceedings against Queen Caroline. In 1802, in conjunction with his father, he was appointed to take notes of evidence before the committees of the Houses of Lords and Commons, and in May 1813 he was formally appointed shorthand writer to the houses of parliament, his emolument being two guineas a day for attendance, and one shilling a folio for the transcript of his notes. He is mentioned as a famous shorthand writer in Byron's Don Juan, canto i. st. clxxxix.

Religious & philanthropic interests
Gurney joined with his friend, Joseph Fox, in 1795 and opened a Sunday school at Walworth, of which he in the following year became the secretary. In 1801 he commenced the Maze Pond Sunday school, an establishment almost akin to a ragged school, and here he introduced the Scottish method of catechising in the scriptures. On 13 July 1803 he was present at a public meeting in Surrey Chapel schoolroom, when the "Sunday School Union" was established. Of this society he became successively secretary, treasurer, and president, and at the jubilee meeting in 1853 was one of the three surviving original subscribers. In 1805, with other persons, he commenced The Youth's Magazine, a cheap popular periodical, devoted to religious subjects. It was the earliest publication of the kind, and one of the most successful. For ten years Gurney was a joint editor of this work, for thirty years its treasurer, and until his death an occasional contributor exercising some general supervision. A large profit made on it was devoted to educational and missionary institutions. He was a member of the first committee of the London Female Penitentiary, formed in 1807, and was one of the lay preachers who for many years took the Sunday services in that institution.

In 1812, on the establishment of the Westminster auxiliary of the British and Foreign Bible Society, he was elected a member of the first committee, and soon after became secretary. In connection with the baptist denomination he was treasurer of Stepney College from 1828, and of their foreign missions from 1835. Like his father he was warmly interested in the anti-slavery movement. Towards rebuilding chapels in Jamaica and sending additional ministers there he was a liberal contributor, besides frequently receiving baptist missionaries into his own house. He purchased a residence at Muswell Hill, Middlesex, in 1826, when the Rev. Eustace Carey, who had recently returned from India, came to reside with him. The house was then licensed as a place of worship, and during four years Carey and other ministers held Sunday evening services in the drawing-room. In March 1803 he married Miss Benham, who died at Muswell Hill in 1830.

Gurney died at Denmark Hill on 25 March 1855, and was buried in the family vault at West Norwood Cemetery.

Works
Gurney was author of A Lecture to Children and Youth on the History and Characters of Heathen Idolatry. With some references to the effects of Christian Missions, 1848. He edited the fifteenth and sixteenth editions of his grandfather's Brachygraphy, 1824 and 1835. His son Joseph Gurney followed in his father's steps as a shorthand writer and biblical scholar.

References
Attribution

External links
 
 
 Works by William Gurney at Google Books
 Trial of Pedro de Zulueta, jun., on a charge of slave trading – shorthand report by Gurney, from the Internet Archive

1777 births
1855 deaths
English philanthropists
Burials at West Norwood Cemetery